Ectomyelois is a genus of small moths belonging to the family Pyralidae.

Species
 Ectomyelois austrella Neunzig & Goodson, 1992
 Ectomyelois bipectinalis Ren & Yang, 2016
 Ectomyelois ceratoniae (Zeller, 1839)
 Ectomyelois decolor (Zeller, 1881)
 Ectomyelois furvidorsella (Ragonot, 1888)
 Ectomyelois furvivena Ren & Yang, 2016
 Ectomyelois muriscis (Dyar, 1914)
 Ectomyelois zeteki Heinrich, 1956

Taxonomy
Ectomyelois is placed as a synonym of Apomyelois by some authors.

References

Phycitini
Pyralidae genera
Taxa named by Carl Heinrich